The Cameroon women's national under-20 football team represents Cameroon in international youth women's football competitions.

The team won the silver medal in the women's tournament at the 2019 African Games held in Rabat, Morocco.

See also 
 Cameroon women's national football team

References 

under-20
African women's national under-20 association football teams